Mieders is a municipality in the southern part of the district Innsbruck-Land in the Austrian state of Tyrol. It is located on the right side of the Stubaital 10.60 km south of Innsbruck.

History
Founded in 1100, the scattered village is located on a gently rising slope of the valley at the foot of the 2718 m high Serles. Inhabited from the early Middle Ages, the centre has houses decorated with baroque frescoes.

Population

Tourism
Two seasonal tourist resorts are located directly at the bottom of the skiing and hiking area Serlesbahnen. The slopes are also known for a summer alpine coaster (monorail), which extends from the top station to the base station of the gondola, leading through the lower wooded slopes of the forest, parallel to the route of the cable car.

Transportation
The town of Innsbruck is connected by a bus line.

Neighboring municipalities
Fulpmes
Mühlbachl
Schönberg im Stubaital
Telfes

References

External links

Cities and towns in Innsbruck-Land District